Labinot Harbuzi (4 April 1986 – 11 October 2018) was a Swedish professional footballer who played as a midfielder.

Early life
Harbuzi's family migrated to Sweden. His father, Ismet, was a table tennis player in Kosovo. He was the cousin (aunt's son) of the Kosovar judoka Majlinda Kelmendi.

Club career

Early career
Growing up in the Malmö district Rosengård, he began his career with Malmö BI, the same club where Zlatan Ibrahimović began his career. Being a very hot prospect in his young years, he was spotted by Swedish Malmö FF.

Feyenoord
At 15 years old, he was signed by Dutch club Feyenoord where he started playing professional football in the club's reserve team and youth team. In 2005, he was loaned to their satellite club Excelsior where he played 9 league games.

Malmö FF
In the spring of 2006, he returned to Malmö FF and made his Allsvenskan debut that same year. In 2009, he made history when he became the first goalscorer in the then newly built Swedbank Stadion.

Gençlerbirliği
On 11 July 2009, Harbuzi signed with the Turkish club Gençlerbirliği S.K. His contract with the side started in January 2010, when his contract with Malmö FF expired. He has since scored 5 goals, gaining 11 assists, a promising returning for a Bosman signing. He has received great praise from Gençlerbirliği fans and head coach, Fuat Çapa. He left Gençlerbirliği on 20 December 2011 after coming to a mutual agreement with the club to terminate his contract.

Melaka United 
Harbuzi joined Malaysian Premier League club Melaka United on 13 November 2015. He missed the first 5 league matches of the 2016 season due to a pre-season injury. He made immediate impact on his first appearance for Melaka United, when he produced an assist in the 2nd minute for teammate Ilija Spasojević to equalise against UiTM F.C. He went on to score a goal on his debut in the 46th minute in a match which Melaka United dominated and eventually won 3–1. He was however released by Melaka United at the end of 2016, playing only one season for the club.

International career
He was a Swedish under-21 international, making his debut against Republic of Ireland on 28 February 2006. He also played in the 2009 UEFA European Under-21 Football Championship.

In 2011, Harbuzi declared to the media in two different interviews that, given his ethnicity and also his feelings about being an Albanian, he desired to be part of Albania's national football team in the future and was eagerly awaiting a convocation and had been in contact with the Albanian Football Association.

Death
On 11 October 2018, Harbuzi died. According to his friend, fellow footballer Paweł Cibicki, who met with him the previous day, Harbuzi did not show any signs of illness. During the next morning, Harbuzi suffered cardiac arrest and was found in critical condition by his father. After his parents performed CPR, he was transported by ambulance to the hospital, where he died. Harbuzi was 32 years old.

Honours
Melaka United
 Malaysia Premier League: 2016

References

1986 births
2018 deaths
Sportspeople from Lund
Swedish footballers
Malmö FF players
Feyenoord players
Excelsior Rotterdam players
Manisaspor footballers
Gençlerbirliği S.K. footballers
Sweden under-21 international footballers
Sweden youth international footballers
Swedish people of Kosovan descent
Expatriate footballers in the Netherlands
Expatriate footballers in Turkey
Expatriate footballers in Malaysia
Swedish expatriate footballers
Swedish people of Albanian descent
Kosovan expatriate sportspeople in Sweden
Eerste Divisie players
Süper Lig players
Allsvenskan players
Syrianska FC players
KSF Prespa Birlik players
Melaka United F.C. players
Association football midfielders
FC Rosengård 1917 players